The Menominee was an electric automobile built in Menominee, Michigan by the Menominee Electric Manufacturing Company in 1915.

History 
Menominee Electric Manufacturing Company mainly built electric motors, telephones and electric appliances. Menominee controlled Dudly Tool Company, makers of the Dudly Bug cyclecar and used that experience to develop a light electric cabriolet. The cabriolet had a 108-inch wheelbase, with a top speed of 20 mph and a range of 50–60 miles on each charge.  A price of $1,250 also included a recharging kit for the battery. Production had started in July 1915, but had ended by the end of the year. The planned production quota of 125 electric automobiles was not reached; unsold Menominees were rebranded as the Dudly Electric and offered for less than $1,000.

See also
List of defunct United States automobile manufacturers
History of the electric vehicle

References

Defunct motor vehicle manufacturers of the United States
Motor vehicle manufacturers based in Michigan
Electric vehicles introduced in the 20th century
Defunct brands
Defunct manufacturing companies based in Michigan

Brass Era vehicles
1910s cars
Electric vehicles in the United States
Cars introduced in 1915